The Challengers is an American game show that aired in syndication from September 3, 1990 until August 30, 1991. The show remained in production for its entire run on the air, differing from most syndicated game shows which usually wrapped in the early summer.

The series was created by Ron Greenberg and was based largely on his 1969 production, The Who, What, or Where Game. Dick Clark presided over the show with Don Morrow announcing. The Challengers was a joint production of Ron Greenberg Productions and Dick Clark Productions, with Buena Vista Television (now Disney–ABC Domestic Television) as distributor.

Gameplay
Three contestants, one a returning champion, competed on each show.

Challengers Sprint Round
Each player was given $200 to start the round. Clark asked a series of toss-up questions for which players had to buzz in. Correct answers added $100 to a player's score, while incorrect answers deducted $100 and took the question out of play for the other two players. (In the first episodes, players started with $0; also, if one player missed a question, either opponent could then buzz in to answer.)

The round ended after 60 seconds, and the player in the lead gained initial control for the first round. If two players were tied, one final Sprint question was asked, with a correct answer or an incorrect answer by an opponent gaining control.

This round was briefly removed partway through the run (concurrent with the change to the daily "Ultimate Challenge" format, as described below) in favor of a single toss-up question, with the contestant who answered correctly scoring $100 and control of the Round 1 board. If someone buzzed in and did not answer correctly, he/she lost $100 and a new toss-up was given to the other two contestants. These rules did not last long, and by February 1991, the Challengers Sprint had been reinstated.

Round 1
Six categories, each containing three questions, were displayed on a video wall. The contestant in the lead after the Challengers Sprint (or the one who answered the single toss-up correctly when the Sprint was not in use) chose one to begin the round. The contestants were then given clues to the subjects of the three questions, valued at $150, $200, and $250 in order of increasing difficulty (later reduced to $100, $150, and $200). Correct answers added the value of the question to the contestant's score, while incorrect answers subtracted the same value.

Each contestant secretly chose one of the three questions using buttons on their podiums, and their choices affected the gameplay as follows:
 Each contestant chose a different question. The three questions were asked in increasing order of value, with each contestant answering his/her own question.
 Two contestants chose one question; the third contestant chose a different one. The two questions were asked in increasing order of value. The solo contestant had to answer his/her own question, while the two who chose the same question used their buzzers. If the first contestant of the two who chose the same question answered incorrectly, the other could either pass or try to answer.
 All three contestants chose the same question. All three question values were immediately doubled, and the chosen question was asked as a toss-up open to all three contestants. The same toss-up rules as above applied. A contestant who answered correctly could either end the category or attempt either of the remaining two questions unopposed. Correctly answering this second question again gave the contestant the option to stop or try the third question. An incorrect answer on either the second or third question subtracted its doubled value from the contestant's score and ended the category.

In each case, the category was eliminated from play and the last contestant to give a correct answer chose the next one. Play continued until all six categories were played or time ran out.

Round 2
Six new categories were introduced and play continued as described above, with all question values doubled ($300/$400/$500, later $200/$300/$400).

As in Round One, play continued until all six categories were played or time ran out. Any players who finished the round with a zero or negative score were eliminated from the game.

Final Challenge
One final category was presented, with three question choices, each of which offered different payout odds of 1:1, 2:1, or 3:1 ranked by increasing difficulty. The contestants had 15 seconds to secretly choose a question and decide how much of their score they wanted to wager on it. If multiple contestants chose the same question, only the one who placed the largest wager was allowed to answer it; the others were locked out of the round.

Answering a question correctly won the value of the wager multiplied by the odds, while a miss deducted only the value of the wager. The player in the lead after this round won the game and returned as champion the next day, although all contestants kept what they had earned. Each contestant had a Citibank Visa account (later, they could choose a MasterCard) opened in their name before the show started and any money they won was deposited into that account. Contestants could also choose to receive their winnings in cash rather than open the account. Champions remained on the show until they were defeated.

If only one contestant finished the second round with a positive total, he/she had the option to skip the Final Challenge. If he/she decided to play it, the category and questions were presented as before, and the contestant chose one at a time, made a wager, and answered. After each correct response, he/she could either end the round or take another question. The round ended when the contestant either played all three questions, gave an incorrect answer, or chose to stop.

Ultimate Challenge
The Challengers, like many game shows, employed a bonus round. The round was referred to as the Ultimate Challenge, and offered a prize of five figures to any champion who managed to beat it.

Format #1
The initial Ultimate Challenge format saw the champion face a choice of two categories. Each category had three questions, which were asked in order based on difficulty. After each question, the champion was given five seconds to think about his/her answer before being prompted to give it. A wrong answer on any question ended the Ultimate Challenge and the champion won nothing extra. This format was in effect from September 3 through November 20, 1990.

Outside of the pilot episode, where the winning contestant played the round, a champion had to win three games in order to play the Ultimate Challenge. Once this was done, the Ultimate Challenge would be played at the start of the next day’s program (to accommodate this, the first round would be abbreviated). 

Under this format, the Ultimate Challenge was played for an accumulating cash jackpot. Originally, the jackpot was started at $50,000 and was to go up by $5,000 for each time it was played and not won. Since the jackpot was not won on the pilot episode, the series began with it standing at $55,000. 

After two weeks of episodes, in which no champion had won the required three games to advance to the round, two changes were made beginning with the September 17, 1990 edition of The Challengers. The first, which was to take effect after the initial jackpot was claimed, was to reduce the starting value of the jackpot to $25,000. The second, which took effect immediately, added $1,000 to the jackpot for every day it went unclaimed. 

The first contestant to win the necessary three games was Larry Caplan, who played the Ultimate Challenge for the initial jackpot on September 24, 1990 and won $60,000 by correctly answering all three questions. The Ultimate Challenge was won three additional times under its original format. Russell Giles won a $42,000 jackpot in October 1990, while Scott Peterson won a $36,000 jackpot on November 2, and Stan Newman won the last Ultimate Challenge played under the original format on November 20 for $31,000; Newman’s win made him the first and only contestant in the show’s run to top $100,000 in winnings.

Format #2
Beginning on November 21, 1990, the Ultimate Challenge was reconfigured as a daily bonus round with $10,000 cash at stake. Initially, as before, the champion was presented with a choice of categories before the round began. Later the choice was dropped and the champion was told the category at the outset of the round.

Instead of needing to answer three questions correctly to win the Ultimate Challenge, the champion only had to answer one. However, the question could and often did contain multiple answers and all parts had to be answered correctly in order for the champion to win the $10,000.

The Ultimate Challenge was eventually done away with; while an exact date has yet to be determined, the round was retired sometime after the February 15, 1991 episode.

Tournaments

Tournament of Champions
For the first two months that The Challengers was on the air, contestants were not only competing to win money but were also trying to earn spots in the show's Tournament of Champions. The tournament was conducted the week of November 12, 1990, and its structure was similar to the one employed by Jeopardy! during its own tournaments. Nine players faced off on the first three days of the tournament, with the three winners playing a two-day cumulative score final. All three players kept whatever they earned in the two games, with the tournament winner earning an additional $25,000.

After the match played on the November 9 episode, the field was set. Eight of the spots were filled by former champions. On the November 9 edition of the program, reigning champion Stan Newman won his second match and his total to that point made him one of the nine highest winners. In an unusual move, as many game shows that conduct tournaments like this do not feature sitting champions (including Jeopardy!), Newman interrupted his reign as champion to compete in the tournament.

The final concluded on November 16, 1990 with Newman emerging victorious over Russell Giles and Gene Murray in the two-match final. He won a total of $41,265 in the final, which included the bonus of $25,000; he finished his reign as champion with a total of $112,480 across his entire run, which included the Ultimate Challenge victory previously mentioned where he won $31,000 in the last round played under its original format.

Teachers Tournament
Nine teachers competed, using the same format as the Tournament of Champions; $10,000 was awarded to the winner.

Invitational Tournament
The Challengers invited nine more champions back for a second tournament of champions, which was held the week of March 18, 1991. The Challengers Invitational Tournament was conducted the same way that the Tournament of Champions was, with a two-day cumulative score final determining the champion and a cash bonus of $10,000 awarded to the winner on top of what they had earned in the two-day final. Lorin Burte won the Tournament by recording a total of $34,600 in the final, and with the $10,000 bonus added to that and the $46,075 won during his reign as champion, he finished with $90,675.

Questions
Many questions were related to current events, an aspect that the producers saw as a selling point. Episodes were taped shortly before their airdate, which was prominently displayed in the opening and on a screen behind Clark; generally, a week of episodes were taped on the Friday of the previous week, which allowed such categories as "This Week On TV" and "Today At The Movies" to be used frequently.

Most of the current event questions and answers were taken from, or verified by, Newsweek; this was announced on-air at the midpoint of each episode.

The series was also unique in its payout structure: contestants received their winnings on a Citibank Mastercard or Visa credit card, although Dick referenced in some episodes that contestants had the option of converting the balance to cash.

References

External links
 

First-run syndicated television programs in the United States
1990s American game shows
1990 American television series debuts
1991 American television series endings
Television series by Disney–ABC Domestic Television
Television series by Dick Clark Productions